Kuhlia marginata, the dark-margined flagtail, spotted flagtail, silver flagtail, orange-finned flagtail, northern jungle perch or mountain bass, is a species of diadromous ray-finned fish, a flagtail from the family Kuhliidae. It is found in eastern Asia and Oceania.

Description
Kuhlia marginata has a moderately deep, compressed body with a moderately pointed head. The large, oblique mouth is protractile with a projecting lower jaw. The mouth extends to just in front of the pupil. It is silvery in colour and is normally marked with dark spots on the posterior, dorsal part of the body and these merge towards the head to form a horizontal dusky band or the dark pigment is concentrated on the edges of the scales. Most of the snout and the tip of the chin are blackish. The caudal fin is pale with a black rear edge which gets wider towards the tips of the lobes, and has a very wide pale submarginal area which frequently has a chevron-shaped blackish band or a row of dusky spots running parallel to the edge. The caudal peduncle is marked with small blackish spots. The margin of the soft-rayed portions of the dorsal and anal fins has a thin white margin and has a broad blackish submarginal zone which gets thinner towards the rear, this is wider on the dorsal fin. There is a distinct patch of red colour on the anal fin and the upper and lower lobes of the tail are pointed. The dorsal fin has 10 spines and 10-12 soft rays while the anal fin has 3 spines and 11-12 soft rays.

Distribution
Kuhlia marginata is a widespread Indo-Pacific specs which occurs from Japan in the north to Australia in the south and east into the central Pacific as far as the Caroline Islands. Its Australian distribution extends from Cape Tribulation to the Russell River in Queensland.

Habitat and biology
It is frequently recorded in estuarine environments but rarely in the sea. Spawning takes place in the sea and it remains in the sea as a larva and juvenile before migrating up rivers to mature. It cannot get past waterfalls so tends to occur in the lower and mid-catchments of river systems where it prefers steep fast-flowing streams. Chemical analysis of sample otoliths suggested that many males do not return to freshwater after breeding but females may return to the sea to spawn several times during their lives.

References

Kuhlia
Taxonomy articles created by Polbot
Fish described in 1829
Taxa named by Georges Cuvier